Quaid Ahmed, also spelled Qua-id Ahmed is a Pakistani singer-songwriter from Karachi. He sings in various genres including Sufi rock.

Early life 
Ahmed started out on Pakistani television before becoming a fulltime musician.

Career 
After releasing Elhaam and Sunlo' albums, Ahmed released Nirali, his third overall and second solo album with an EDM artist/producer Zaphixx 2022. Quaid worked in collaboration with artists from several countries. He toured the US and Europe in 2017, 2018 and 2019. 

He was associated with the Pakistani band Sounds Of Kolachi as a founder and lead vocalist (2013-2021).

He sang and recorded “The Official National Anthem” of Pakistan with 140 voices, produced by Rohail Hyatt and Arshad Mehmud.

Sounds Of Kolachi's debut album was Elhaam."SOK" was a commercial success.

He works with Geo TV, singing and writing satirical music pieces for the show Hasna Mana Hai with Tabish Hashmi, as a producer, composer, writer and curator. He worked with Atif Aslam, Fawad Khan, EP, Zulfi, Meesha Shafi, Natasha Baig, Zeb Bangash, Sounds Of Kolachi, and Mekaal Hasan.

Discography

Singles 

 "Allah Hi Dega" - Sounds Of Kolachi - 2017
 "Theher Jaa" - 2019 - Laal Series

Sunlo 

 "Shamein" - 2019
 "Sunlo" - 2020
 "Jugnu" - 2020
 "Kaun Hai" - 2020
 "PariNama" - 2020

Nirali (Quaid Ahmed x Zaphixx) 

 "Jani Janay" - 2022
 "Teri Yaad" - 2022
 "Paas Hongay" - 2022
 "Kaun Hai 2.0" - 2022
 "Sadaa" - 2022
 "Kaa Karun" - 2022
 "Tum Chahiye Ho" - 2022
 "Nirali Raat" - 2022

Composer 

 "Kaise Kahoon" - Natasha Baig (2020)
 "Saiyyan" - Natasha Baig (2021)
 "Chalta Rahoon" - Teen Talwar (2020)

References

External links 

 
 

Pakistani singer-songwriters
Year of birth missing (living people)
Living people